Jason Frost is an in-house pseudonym used by two authors, Raymond Obstfeld  (born 1952) and Rich Rainey, who wrote the six book series called The Warlord published by Zebra Mens Adventure, a division of Zebra Books that is ultimately a subsidiary of Kensington Publishing Corporation. The books were written and published from 1983 to 1987 .

Bibliography

The Warlord series
Pulp fiction genre.  After twin earthquakes have broken California off from the US mainland and surrounded it with an impenetrable radioactive zone, a large group of people are cut off from everyone else with no single unifying government.  Through the travels of a thirty-something survivor, the books describe the sociological situation in the aftermath.
Books #1-5 were written by Obstfeld while #6 was written by Rainey.

 The Warlord (1983) 
 The Cutthroat (1984) 
 Badland (1984) 
 PrisonLand (1985) 
 Terminal Island (1985) 
 Killers Keep (1987)

Novels
 Invasion U.S.A. (1985) , novelization of film

References

External links

American male writers
20th-century pseudonymous writers
Collective pseudonyms
Writing duos